DC Inside, also known as DC, is a South Korean internet forum that was founded in 1999. It is a prominent online platform in the country, allowing users to engage in discussions on a diverse range of subjects, such as entertainment, politics, and personal interests. The forum features user-generated content, including written posts, images, and videos, which are contributed by its active user base. DC Inside has established itself as a significant hub for online discussion in South Korea.

Overview

Initially established as a community of interest dedicated to digital cameras and photography in October 1999, it soon expanded continuously to the propagation of additional image boards. The vestige lies on the name (short for Digital Camera), and the fact that the term 'gallery' refers to each imageboards.

History 
The website was primarily populated by early adopters of electronic devices, and was incorporated in 2000.

As of 2006, it had 500 active boards, and Kim anticipated the count to multiply to over 1000 by the latter half of 2007.

In 2009, it stopped providing information about Digital Camera since it has transformed to general imageboard website.

In 2013, it departed from using the remodeled version of "Zeroboard", a popular Korean free-to-use script for bulletin board systems. Zeroboard was called to have security vulnerabilities and bandwidth issues hence many users expressed frustration in regards of the matter as early as from 2006.

In 2015, own Wiki was created.

In 2016, new reform contained user's availability to request a new imageboard subject. These imageboards, minor galleries, are separated from previous galleries.

Gallery 
The early galleries were for uploading user-created camera pictures, which led to its rule to mandatorily upload images for each post. Such rule is bygone today.

Gallery topics range from generic categories such as politics, science, wiki, sports and video games to particular subjects such as those committed to individual celebrities and K-pop stars. New galleries are created if new topic is acknowledged and deemed appropriate by the site administrator.

Minor gallery 
New minor galleries are created upon user request. Request message should explain the gallery topic which should not be inappropriate, and should not overlap with existing galleries. Highly active minor galleries can be promoted into main galleries by administrators. In this case, administrators take the rights to manage the galleries.

Administrator / Manager 
Galleries are controlled by site administrators, while minor galleries are controlled by dedicated user accounts, called by the name manager, or more frequently be the slang 주딱 ('Ju-ttak', orange-badge), by the fact that their usernames come with an orange badge. Manager roles are first assigned to ones requested creation of that gallery, and the role can be handed over to other users. Sub-managers can be appointed by managers and get a blue badge, leading them to be called 파딱('Pa-ttak', blue-badge).

HIT gallery 
Site administrators choose posts along the whole website to re-upload on HIT gallery. There are no specific standards of choosing, but it generally contains fun, useful posts. The user who created the original post can request administrators to delete it on HIT gallery.

Culture
The culture varies for different galleries. One shared trait is that users call themselves as X-붕이('Boong-yi'), where X contains the gallery name's first syllable.

Anonymity
One of the site's unique traits is its anonymity, which led to its atmosphere different from other Korean major forums.

Since 2007, you can choose to register, log-in and use your own account. Before that, it was a fully anonymous forum.

The anonymity led users to communicate casually, expressively, and with insults and abuses.

Parody and neologisms 
It's a main source of popular jokes, buzzwords, and neologisms in Korea.  Parodies, satires and slangs made of controversial social/political phenomenon/public figures is shared, and are quickly spread to other online communities and eventually to news, advertisements and everyday life. Some popular slangs are as follows:

 잉여 ('Ying-Yar', surplus), means a person who is incompetent and useless in society, and was used widely pre-2010.
 헬조선 (hell Joseon), which speaks for itself, was generated in History Gallery, which was notorious for anti-Koreanism as of 2015. The word roughly means living in Korea is harsh and hopeless.

As an alternative mass media 
The criticism to Hwang Woo-Suk was first led by Science Gallery along with BRIC forum in 2005. Stock gallery found video of evidences for the trial of Kim Ki-Choon, central member of 2016 South Korean political scandal. The video was referenced in the parliamentary audit by congresswoman Park Young-sun.

Conservatism and misogyny 
Initially a voice for left-wing politics, mainstream users turned to right-wing conservative views in early as 2013.

Many galleries are criticized of misogyny, and the baseball gallery is pointed out for its secondary offense toward high school teachers reporting sexual assaults.

Incidents and controversy

Formation of Megalia 

MERS gallery (for Middle East respiratory syndrome outbreak) was created in spring of 2015, and became a place for bashing two women who was falsely accused for contracting MERS, refusing quarantine and went shopping to Hong Kong. They were bashed as "kimchi woman" (gimchi-nyeo), a misogynist term for women who only have shopping on their minds.

As this continued, an influx of Feminists started using reactionary terms, coining "kimchi man" (gimchi-nam) a reclaimed term which mocks Korean men. DC Inside intervened by instituting a policy, which forbade usage of "kimchi man". A portion of its users regarded the measure as discriminatory, which eventually led to creation of a Feminist website, Megalia.

Lee Kun-hee death rumors 
On July 4, 2016, police raided DC Inside and Ilbe Storage, which spread rumors of Samsung Group Chairman Lee Kun-hee's death in an apparent bid to boost stock prices.

See also
 Alt-lite
 Ilbe Storehouse, an off-shoot forum of DC Inside. It's a more hardline right-wing forum than DCinside.

Notes

References

External links

Official wiki (DCWiki)

Internet properties established in 1999
1999 establishments in South Korea
Internet forums
Opposition to feminism in South Korea
Photography websites
Right-wing politics in South Korea
Sexism in South Korea
South Korean websites